Triplophysa cakaensis is a small species of stone loach in the genus Triplophysa. It is endemic to Ulan, Qinghai Province, China. It grows to  SL.

References

C
Freshwater fish of China
Endemic fauna of China
Taxa named by Cao Wen-Xuan & 
Taxa named by Zhu Song-Quan
Fish described in 1988